An index of the constituency articles, showing which constituency names from this list they include, can be found at Wikipedia:Index of article on UK Parliament constituencies in England (for A-M) and Wikipedia:Index of articles on UK Parliament constituencies in England N-Z.

The official names of United Kingdom parliamentary constituencies in England (some of which originate from the names used for constituencies in predecessor Parliaments) are those given in the legal instrument creating the constituency or re-defining it at a re-distribution of seats.

The purpose of this article is to set out official names, taken from official sources wherever possible, to provide a definitive list which can then be used as a resource by those constructing constituency articles and other lists involving constituencies. It is requested that no amendments be made to the list, without a citation from a legal instrument creating the constituency, which has a greater validity than the source currently being used.

The names for the 1707 constituencies are, in general, taken from Namier and Brookes. The alternative forms for names, used in legislation abolishing some of the pre-1832 constituencies or in the case of Mitchell in common use as an alternative name, are included in the note column.

The list includes Greater London constituencies for 1974–1983 with the London Borough prefix as used in the official name. In practice articles have been done without the London Borough name. An example of the difficulty is the Acton constituency. The article which currently (December 2006) exists covers the period 1918–1983. There is a related article for Ealing Acton for the period from 1983. The official name for the constituency 1974-1983 was Ealing Acton but, in accordance with the practice adopted for other Greater London constituencies in the 1974 redistribution, the London Borough prefix was ignored. In the 1983 redistribution the London Borough name was dropped from most Greater London official constituency names, but retained for Ealing Acton.

N

O

P

Q

R

S

T

U

V

W

Y

Sources

The 1945 redistribution affected only limited areas, with over-sized constituencies (containing more than 100,000 voters). It was an interim measure before a general review by the Boundary Commission for England.

References
 The House of Commons 1754-1790, by Sir Lewis Namier and John Brooke (HMSO 1964)

Official names of United Kingdom Parliamentary Constituencies in England